Helicites may refer to:
 Helicites, a genus of gastropods in the family Helicidae, synonym of Helix
 Helicites, a genus of foraminifers in the family Nummulitidae, synonym of Nummulites